The Malappuram Metropolitan Area or Malappuram Urban Agglomeration is an urban agglomeration centred around the city of Malappuram, Manjeri in Malappuram district, Kerala, India. It is the 25th largest urban agglomeration in India and the 4th largest in Kerala. 

It consists of Malappuram municipality, its adjoining municipalities, and census towns. It has a population of 1.7 million as per the 2011 Census of India. It is the only city in Kerala with a million-plus urban agglomeration that is yet to be upgraded to a Municipal Corporation. It is the  fastest-growing metropolitan area in the world with a 44.1% urban growth between 2015 and 2020 as per the survey conducted by Economist Intelligence Unit (EIU) based on urban area growth during January 2020. As of 2011, Malappuram metropolitan area has a literacy rate of 94.14%, which is higher than the national urban average of 85%.

Constituents of the urban agglomeration 
According to the 2011 census, the Malappuram metropolitan area comprises the following constituents:

Proposed Malappuram Municipal Corporation 

Malappuram is the only million-plus urban agglomeration (metropolitan area) of Kerala which has no municipal corporation within its limit. However, there is a demand to upgrade the Malappuram Municipality into a Municipal Corporation by incorporating the local bodies in Greater Malappuram region.
The proposed Malappuram Municipal Corporation comprises:
 Malappuram Municipality
Manjeri Municipality
Kottakkal Municipality
Anakkayam Outgrowth
Trikkalangode, a suburb village of Manjeri
Koottilangadi, a suburb village of Malappuram
Pookkottur, a suburb village of Malappuram
Kodur, a suburb village of Malappuram
Ponmala, a suburb village of Malappuram
Othukkungal, an outgrowth of Malappuram
Makkaraparamba

See also

Administration of Malappuram
Education in Malappuram
History of Malappuram
List of desoms in Malappuram (1981)
List of Gram Panchayats in Malappuram
List of people from Malappuram
List of villages in Malappuram
Transportation in Malappuram
Malappuram district
South Malabar

References

External links
 Government of Kerala – Malappuram Portal
 Government of India – Malappuram Portal

Malappuram
Cities and towns in Malappuram district
Populated coastal places in India
Metropolitan areas of India